The Women's Marathon race at the 2005 World Championships in Athletics was held on 14 August in the streets of Helsinki with the goal line situated in the Helsinki Olympic Stadium. Paula Radcliffe set the pace of the race, leading all the way from start to finish. Constantina Tomescu was able to keep up with Radcliffe the longest, but began to fall behind after the 25 km mark and at the end found herself overtaken by the defending champion Catherine Ndereba.

Medalists

Abbreviations
All times shown are in hours:minutes:seconds

Intermediates

Final ranking

See also
 2005 World Marathon Cup

External links
IAAF results

Marathon
Marathons at the World Athletics Championships
2005 marathons
Women's marathons
World Championships in Athletics marathon
Marathons in Finland